Maurizio Zaccaro (born 8 May 1952 in Milan, Italy) is an Italian film director, cinematographer, film editor, and screenwriter.

Biography 

Maurizio Zaccaro was born in Milan. After ending his study at the Milan Film School (1977) he took on work in Ermanno Olmi Film Factory and at the same time developed several short movies.
But with the debut of his movie Where the night begins – Dove comincia la notte (1990), a horror film, he received the David di Donatello Award for Best New Director and stepped into the business of film-making. 

This first movie, entirely shot in United States, is also one of the few that he did not write himself. 

Two years later his second movie Kalkstein – The valley of stone (1992) followed, though not released abroad. This film was the cinematographic adaptation of a novel of the Austrian writer Adalbert Stifter. the Another couple of years later the outstanding Article 2 – l'Articolo 2 (1994), a movie in a style reminiscent of the movies of Italian Neorealism with an almost poetic-like atmosphere.  L' Articolo 2 won the Solinas award for best screenplay.
In 1996, Zaccaro made the war movie The game bag – il Carniere, which also won David di Donatello for best supporting actor, Leo Gullotta, award. Later he directed A Respectable Man (Un uomo perbene) (1999) a legal thriller on Enzo Tortora, a well known anchorman of Italian television. A respectable man won the Pasinetti award in Venice Film Festival 1999, another David di Donatello for best supporting actor award and a Silver Ribbon for best screenplay. Zaccaro then showed his ability to direct TV movies as well, with La missione (The Mission) (1997), Un dono semplice – A simple gift (2000), Cuore – Heart (2001), and I ragazzi della via Pal (The boys of St. Paul street) (2003). Some others of his most successful TV films were Al di là delle frontiere – Beyond borders (2004), Mafalda di Savoia – Mafalda of Savoy (2005), O Professore – The professor (2006), "Lo smemoreato di collegno – The Forgetter" and "Le ragazze dello swing – The queens of swing" awarded in Montecarlo and Shanghai film Festival as best director.

“In writing, preparing, and shooting a film, I’m certain of one thing: I can’t please everyone with each decision I make. This certainty makes me feel free and easy, like the floating feather in Forrest Gump. So, what counts, is only the quality of my work.” Maurizio Zaccaro - Press conference, 66th Venice Film Festival (2009)

Films
director
 1989:In coda della coda
 1991:Dove comincia la notte
 1992:La valle di pietra aka Kalkstein
 1994:L'articolo 2
 1996:Testa matta
 1997:Il carniere
 1998:La missione (TV)
 1999:Cristallo di rocca  (TV)
 1999:A Respectable Man
 2000:Un dono semplice (TV)
 2001:Cuore miniseries
 2003:I ragazzi della via Pál (TV)
 2004:Al di là delle frontiere miniseries
 2005:Il bell'Antonio miniseries
 2006:Mafalda di Savoia miniseries
 2008:Il bambino della domenica miniseries
 2008:O professore (TV)
 2009:Lo smemorato di Collegno (TV)
 2009:Il piccolo 2010:Le ragazze dello swing (TV)
 2011:Un foglio bianco 2012:A testa alta' (TV)
 2013:adelante petrolersos
 2014:Il sindaco pescatore
 2016:La felicità umana - Human happiness

Screenplay
 1989:In coda della coda
 1994:L'articolo 2
 1996:Cervellini fritti impanati
 1997:Il carniere
 1999:A Respectable Man
 1999:Cristallo di rocca (TV)
 2003:I ragazzi della via Pál (TV)
 2006:Mafalda di Savoia  miniseries
 2009:Lo smemorato di Collegno (TV)
 2009:Il piccolo
 2010:Le ragazze dello swing

Cinematographer
 1983:À la poursuite de l'étoile
 1985:Mediatori e carrozze
 1987:Lunga vita alla signora!
 2009:Il piccolo

Film editor
 1989:Maicol
 1991:L'attesa

Assistant director
 2009:Terra madre

References

External links 
 {https://mauriziozaccaro.org}

1952 births
Living people
Film people from Milan
Italian film directors
David di Donatello winners